The St. Andrew lodge Oscar to the burning star (Norwegian: Oscar til den flammende Stjerne) is a Freemasonic Lodge within the Norwegian Order of Freemasons (Lodge of St. Andrew no. 1).

The lodge was founded in Drammen in 1826 as a Craft lodge, practising the three degrees of St. John. After having delivered an application to the Swedish Grand Lodge, it was moved to Christiana and elevated into a St. Andrew lodge practising the Scottish degrees of St. Andrew (IV°-VI°) of the Swedish Rite. The Act of capitulation as a lodge of St. John was formulated on 10 April 1836. Its constituting patent as a lodge of St. Andrew was then worked out on 10 April 1841.

The lodge was one of six founding lodges, establishing the Norwegian Order of Freemasons on 24 June 1891.

Masonic Lodges
Freemasonry in Norway
1826 establishments in Norway
Organizations established in 1826